Nathaniel F. Williams (March 14, 1782 – September 10, 1864) was an American businessman and politician.

Early life 

Nathaniel F. Williams was born March 14, 1782, in Roxbury, Massachusetts. He was the son of Joseph (born 1738) and Susannah (May) Williams. His grandfather, Colonel Joseph Williams (17081798), fought in the French and Indian War in 1755. Before 1799, his brother Benjamin moved from Roxbury to 126 Lombard in Baltimore becoming wealthy in the shipping industry. Benjamin's Daughter Susan May Williams, became well known for her relation to Napoleon through her marriage to Jérôme Napoléon Bonaparte.

He graduated from Harvard College in 1801. Serving as a lawyer in Boston and Annapolis. He married Caroline Barney, daughter of Anne and Commodore Joshua Barney in 1809. With his brothers, Amos, George and Cumberland, he founded the Savage Mill on land next to the Commodore Joshua Barney House in Maryland.

During this time he also served as an attorney for the Maryland Senate, Western Shore from 1811 to 1816. He served as a private, Baltimore Fencibles, War of 1812, becoming wounded at the Battle of North Point in 1814. He was considered dead after being shot on the battlefield in his hip. He was treated by Dr. Owens of the 5th regiment for two days, then sent home on a wagon cart. Nathaniel's brothers Cumberland Dugan, and George Williams were also on the roster of the Fencibles.

When Luther Martin became ill, Williams became Acting Attorney General of Maryland serving from 1820 to 1822. Williams married Maria Pickett Dalrymple in 1829. He was the District of Maryland United States Attorney from 1824 to 1841 and served on the Executive Council from 1835 to 1837. He represented Baltimore City in the Maryland Senate in 1853. He was also a trustee, University of Maryland in 1826. Williams died on September 10, 1864.

During his life he corresponded with Thomas Jefferson and John Adams.

References 

American military personnel of the War of 1812
Savage, Maryland
Harvard College alumni
1782 births
1864 deaths